Karakash may refer to:

Karakash County, county in Hotan Prefecture, Xinjiang, China
Karakash River, river in Xinjiang, China